Amanda Murphy may refer to:
 Amanda Murphy (politician)
 Amanda Murphy (model)